Family Secrets is a Turkish television series produced by Gold Film and aired by Kanal D from Monday at 20:00, between September 19 and December 12, 2016, in 13 episodes. Written by Onur Ugraš and Murat Jurkulak, directed by Nihat Durak with artistic direction by Özüdogru Cici.

Its cast includes Bülten Inal, Ayça Bingöl, Ceyda Düvenci, Caner Şahin, Sera Kutlubey, Sercan Badur and Doğa Zeynep Doğuşlu.

Plot
Kemal is a renowned businessman who lives an enviable life in Istanbul, along with his wife Suzan and sons Mert and Cicek, whom he loves very much. Suzan, for her part, believes she lives in a 20-year marriage that cannot be more perfect, along with two children and a devoted husband whom she is hopelessly in love with. However, following a tragedy that shows even the most perfect of hidden marriages that they prefer not to discover. An accident takes Mert to a hospital bed and a kidney transplant is all that can save his life. Without compatible parents, the time comes when Kemal admits that another family and two more children, which may be Mert's only salvation.

Cast
 Ayça Bingöl as Nilgün Kayalar
 Bülent İnal as Kemal İpekçi
 Ceyda Düvenci as Suzan İpekçi
 Erdem Akakçe as Fadıl Kayalar
 Sercan Badur as Mert İpekçi
 Caner Şahin as Kadir Kayalar
 Sera Kutlubey as Hasret Kayalar
 Emel Göksu as Macide İpekçi
 Eva Dedova as Ece
 Doğa Zeynep Doğuşlu as Çiçek İpekçi
 Kubilay Karslıoğlu as Ahmet
 Fulya Ülvan as Filiz
 Sezin Bozacı as Emine
 Hakan Altuntaş as Rıza
 Ecem Simge Yurdatapan as Yelda
 Can Albayrak as İbo
 İlker Özer as Kerim
 Emre Başer as Orhan
 Kosta Kortidis as Arif

References

External links 

  
 

Turkish drama television series
2016 Turkish television series debuts
2016 Turkish television series endings
Kanal D original programming
Television series produced in Istanbul
Television shows set in Istanbul
Television series set in the 2010s